Château de Faye is the name of several castles in France, including:
 Château de la Faye (Auriac-du-Périgord), Dordogne.
 Château de la Faye (Deviat)
 Château de Faye (Flavignac)
 Château de la Faye (Léguillac).
 Château de la Faye (Olmet) in Puy-de-Dôme.
 Château de la Faye (Saint-Dizier-la-Tour)
 Château la Faye, Saint-Sulpice-de-Mareuil.
 Château de la Faye (Villexavier)
 Manoir de La Faye (Manzac-sur-Vern) in the Dordogne.
 Manoir de La Faye, Sainte-Orse, Dordogne.
 Château de Fayolle (Tocane-Saint-Apre)
 Château de Fayolles (Saussignac)

Gallery

Set index articles
Châteaux in France